Alobo Achümi (born 6 May 1984), known professionally as Alobo Naga, is an Indian singer and songwriter from Nagaland. He rose to fame with his debut album, Road of a Thousand Dreams. He has hosted his talk show, The Alobo Naga Show, since July 2021.

Early life

Alobo Naga was born on 6 May 1984 in Kohima, Nagaland to a Naga family. He did his schooling from Charity School, Kohima, Assembly of God School, Dimapur & Greenwood Higher Secondary School and completed his B.A. in political science from Patkai Christian College. He later attended University of Delhi from 2004 to 2007.

In 2008, he left his full-time job at a construction firm and began studying music.

Career
In 2010, he formed Alobo Naga & The Band (ANTB) and launched his first album in Nagaland.

The band rose to fame in 2011 with their video single "Painted Dreams". It premiered in August 2011 on VH1. Later that year, Alobo Naga & The Band started touring the world.

His second album, Kini was launched in 2017.

On 25 February 2019, mobs who were protesting (against the Arunachal Government's decision to provide permanent residence certificates to non-Arunachal Pradesh Scheduled Tribe residents) set ablaze his band's vehicle containing all their musical instruments at the venue of the  Itanagar International Film Festival (IIFF). Protesters burnt several other vehicles and buildings. He was among the many other artists from other northeastern states who were in Arunachal Pradesh to perform at the 1st Itanagar International Film Festival.

He is the Founder and Director of Musik-A also known as Alobo Naga School of Music. He has also found success on Youtube with his talk show The Alobo Naga Show.

Personal life
On 20 March 2022, Alobo Naga in his Instagram post announced his engagement with Kiniholi Jakha, a former flight attendant for Jet Airways. On 21 October 2022, they married at the Agri Expo, Chümoukedima.

Awards
 Winner of Best Rock Song of The Year, Best Rock Band of the Year, Best Producer of the year – ‘Painted Dreams’ at Nagaland State Music Awards 2011
 Best Rock Band Nomination – Artist Aloud.com 2011 
 Winner of Best Folk Fusion song for “Kumsujulo” at Nagaland Music Award 2011
 In 2012, his band's music video "Painted Dreams" won the Best Indian Act at the 2012 MTV Europe Music Awards (EMA).
 Top 30 Vocalist from India 2014
 Winner of Best Song (Chasing Ghosts), Best English Song (Wolo), Best Artist of North East India at the Artist Aloud Music Awards 2018
 Winner of Indihut Artist of the year 2014, 2015, 2016, 2017
 Governor's Award for excellence in the field of Music (2015)
 Nominated for Best Pop Artist for Radio City Freedom Awards 5
 Nominated for Best Male, Best Song, Best English Song & Best Dance Music at AAMA 2018
 Alobo Naga won three Awards at the 2018 Artist Aloud Music Awards.

Discography

Solo Studio albums
 Road of a Thousand Dreams (2010)
 Kini 2 (2017)

Singles
 Painted Dreams (Dub Step Version) ft. DJ Ina (2012) 
 Laughter & Tears (Single) 7th Sept 2013 
 All We Have is Now – single (2014) collaborated with Tim Palmer
 Anthem Song for North East United FC (ISL) with various artiste from North East India
 Chasing Ghosts (2016)
 Never Let You Go (OST October)
 Ningu Kumtsü (Single) – 2018
 Choro Küpi (Single) – 2018
 Kikimiye Le (Single) - 2020
 Together We Can (Milikena Hatabo) – 2020
 Last Train (Single) – 2020
 Wolo (Single) -2021
 My Pomegranate Girl (Single)- 2021

Others
 Yesterday Today Forever (Various Artiste) (2001)
 Summer Jam (2003) 
 Achumis (2003)
 Icons (Various Artiste) (2008)  
 Kohima Komets Anthem (2012)
 General Election Theme Song (2013) 
 Painted Dreams (2010) 
 Beyond: OST of Bollywood Movie “Beyond” 
 Pal: OST, Te Amo (Bollywood) 
 The Anushree Experiment (OST) 
 2 a.m. at lokhandwala (OST)

Filmography

Web show
The Alobo Naga Show (2021, YouTube)

Film scoring
October
Anushree Experiment
Beyond the Third Kind
Te Amo
2 a.m. at Lokhandwala

Tours and gigs
 Opened for Hoobastank, Shillong 
 Opened for MLTR, Delhi
 Opened for Jennifer Batten, Guitarist of Michael Jackson 
 Opened for Petra (John Schlitt )
 Fringe Festival Scotland UK
 Military Tattoo Festival Edinburgh, UK
 Handshake Concert Jakarta, Indonesia 
 Obama's Pub Festival, Singapore
 Tawadang, Singapore 
 Hongkong
 Kuwait
 Bangladesh
 Macau
 Kenyetta University, Nairobi, Kenya
 Moi university Eldoret Kenya
 Goan Institute Nairobi Kenya
 Dar e salem  university Tanzania
 Dodoma University Tanzania
 Hornbill Festival 2011–2014
 North East Fashion Festival 2013, NSIC Ground Delhi 
 VH1 Band Festival, Someplace else, Kolkata 2014
 Bluefrog Mumbai 2015
 Octave Festival Goa 2015
 Mati Ki Rang Festival 2015
 Karbi Youth Festival 2015
 Itanagar Statehood day Festival 2015
 Naga Fest Mumbai 2015
 Rock Show Aizawl 2015
 NorthEast Song & dances festival, Indra Gandhi Stadium Delhi 2015
 Kokrajhar Bodoland Rock Fest 2015
 NH7 Weekender 2016, Shillong
 Radio City Freedom awards 2016
 The Big Bang Festival 2016
 Spring Festival 2016
 HardRock Café Mumbai 2016
 HardRock Café Delhi 2016
 North East Carnival Bangalore 
 Phoenix City, Bangalore 
 Turquoise Cottage, Delhi 
 Christmas Concert, Siri Fort Auditorium Delhi 
 North East Festival, IGNCA Ground 
 Free Handed Concert 
 Hindu College Fest, Delhi University 
 Jamia Milia Islamis University Fest, New Delhi
 Glorio Deo Concert, Thyagraj Stadium Delhi 
 Naga Fest Talkatora stadium Delhi 
 Tamchon Trophy, Ambedkar Stadium Delhi 
 Naga Fest 
 Great Escape Festival, Uttarkhand 
 Break Free Tour (Live jam) 
 Sophie @ Sunshine Goa 
 Furtados Goa 
 100 Pipers Free Bird Music Festival Hyderabad 
 WORME Festival, Kolkata
 Shillong Autumn Festival
 Turquoise Cottage, New Delhi  
 Talkotara Stadium, New Delhi 
 Club Rhino, Gurgaon
 Someplace Else, Kolkata 
 KINK, Noida 
 Fireball Guwahati 
 Live Jam, New Delhi 
 IIT Alcheringa, Guwahati 
 Kini tour Diphu
 TC Delhi
 K Boulevard Delhi
 HRC Mumbai
 HRC Pune
 Kini tour Manipur : Churachandpur, Imphal, Ukhrul, Senapati

References

External links
 
 
 Alobo Naga on YouTube

1984 births
21st-century Indian male singers
21st-century Indian singers
Naga people
People from Kohima
People from Dimapur
Musicians from Nagaland
Delhi University alumni
Living people